Mauricio Sebastián Alonso Pereda (born 12 February 1994) is an Uruguayan footballer who plays for Mushuc Runa as a winger.

Club career
Born in Montevideo, Alonso represented Cerro as a youth. He made his senior debut on 14 August 2011, starting and scoring the last in a 3–1 home win against Cerrito for the Uruguayan Primera División championship.

On 24 August 2014, Alonso was loaned to fellow top tier club Sud América for one year. Upon returning, he featured rarely before moving to Primera B Nacional side Villa Dálmine in December 2015.

On 7 August 2017 Alonso switched clubs and countries again, after agreeing to a contract with Spanish Segunda División B side CF Lorca Deportiva.

References

External links

1994 births
Living people
Uruguayan footballers
Uruguayan expatriate footballers
Footballers from Montevideo
Association football wingers
Uruguayan Primera División players
Uruguayan Segunda División players
C.A. Cerro players
Sud América players
Villa Dálmine footballers
Central Español players
Primera Nacional players
Deportivo Morón footballers
Mushuc Runa S.C. footballers
Ecuadorian Serie A players
Segunda División B players
CF Lorca Deportiva players
Uruguayan expatriate sportspeople in Spain
Uruguayan expatriate sportspeople in Argentina
Uruguayan expatriate sportspeople in Ecuador
Expatriate footballers in Spain
Expatriate footballers in Ecuador